Aphra is a genus of moths in the subfamily Arctiinae. The genus was described by Watson in 1980.

Species
 Aphra flavicosta Herrich-Schäffer, 1855
 Aphra nyctemeroides Walker, 1869
 Aphra sanguipalpis Dognin, 1907
 Aphra trivittata Walker, 1854

References

Arctiinae
Moth genera